Aurora is an extended play by British rock supergroup Asia, released on 2 April 1986 exclusively in Japan by Geffen Records.

It consists of four songs: "Too Late" from Astra (1985) and three B-sides from different singles. "Ride Easy" was originally available only as a B-side, on "Heat of the Moment" singles, released outside of the United Kingdom, and never appeared on a studio album. In an interview, released on the Fantasia: Live in Tokyo DVD (2007), vocalist and bassist John Wetton said that "Ride Easy" was one of his favorite Asia songs. "Daylight" was initially available as a B-side on "Don't Cry" singles and was featured as a bonus track on original Alpha (1983) cassette editions. "Lying to Yourself" was originally available only as a B-side, on "The Smile Has Left Your Eyes" singles, and never appeared on a studio album. All three B-sides were released on the compilation The Very Best of Asia: Heat of the Moment (1982–1990) (2000).

Aurora reached number 66 in Japan.

Track listing

Personnel

Asia
 Geoff Downes – keyboards, vocals; producer (track 1)
 John Wetton – lead vocals, bass
 Mandy Meyer – guitar (track 1)
 Steve Howe – guitars and vocals (tracks 2–4)
 Carl Palmer – drums, percussion

Technical personnel
 Mike Stone – producer
 Yasutaka Kato – art direction, design
 Shigeru Bando – photography

Charts

References

Asia (band) albums
1986 debut EPs
Progressive rock EPs
Geffen Records EPs